Paul Lord (born 13 December 1969) is a squash player from England.

Competition results
He was runner-up to Rodney Eyles at the US Open in 1993.

References

External links
 

1969 births
Living people
English male squash players